Liolaemus vulcanus is a species of lizard in the family Iguanidae or the family Liolaemidae. The species is endemic to Argentina.

References

vulcanus
Lizards of South America
Reptiles of Argentina
Endemic fauna of Argentina
Reptiles described in 2011
Taxa named by Andrés Sebastián Quinteros
Taxa named by Cristian Simón Abdala